Kłodzino may refer to the following places:
Kłodzino, Kamień County in West Pomeranian Voivodeship (north-west Poland)
Kłodzino, Pyrzyce County in West Pomeranian Voivodeship (north-west Poland)
Kłodzino, Szczecinek County in West Pomeranian Voivodeship (north-west Poland)
Kłodzino, Świdwin County in West Pomeranian Voivodeship (north-west Poland)